Yosef/Joseph "Joe" Nakash (born 1942) is an Israeli-American businessman, real estate investor, and co-founder of Jordache Enterprises.

Early life and education
Nakash was born in Tel Aviv, Israel, to parents of Sephardic Jewish descent. His father was born in Iraq, whereas his mother in Syria, prior to their immigration to Israel. In 1962, he immigrated to New York City where he worked as a stock boy and saved enough money to bring his brothers Raphael (Ralph) and Abraham (Avi) to the United States in 1966.

Career
In 1974, pooling their $20,000 in savings, they purchased an appliance store called V.I.M. and opened a retail store in Bushwick, Brooklyn selling irregular jeans latching onto the newfound popularity of designer jeans. By 1978, they had four stores and after their largest store was burned during the New York City blackout of 1977, they took the $120,000 policy settlement and started to manufacture their own brand of upscale jeans under the Jordache label. Joe Nakash hired Howard Goldstein an advertising executive who in turn hired composer and lyricist Leigh Crizoe known for producing many popular advertising campaigns and jingles in NYC. Leigh Crizoe created the fabulously famous "You’ve Got The Look I Want To Know Better, The Jordache Look" music jingle and campaign for the Nakash Brothers. The Jordache Look jingle took off like wildfire and within 8 weeks millions of New Yorkers were singing the popular jingle as if it was a top charting billboard hit song. The Nakash Brothers funded the campaign with $300,000 of their own money and $250,000 from Israel's Bank Leumi made the brand a resounding success with all age and gender demographics. In future commercialsBrooke Shields was promoted in the Jordache ads serving as the company's in-house model. In 1979, Jordache had $72 million in sales. In 1981, they started licensing the brand which added $100 million to their $200 million a year in wholesale revenue for its jeans and expanded their line to include children's clothing, makeup, handbags and suitcases. In 1983, revenues grew to $400 million and they founded Yama Maritime Inc. which owned eight cargo ships. "The Jordache Look" jingle, written by Mr. Crizoe, was utilized by Jordache Enterprises for almost 10 years in their advertising campaigns and was used for many of the product lines as well as airing in over 37 countries. The campaign spawned the designer jeans boom of the 1980s of which people still view the commercials on YouTube even to this day.

In 1983, they acquired a 50% stake in Guess Jeans from the Marciano Brothers (Paul, Georges, Armand and Maurice) of Los Angeles. The joint venture soured and in 1989, a California superior court jury found that the Nakashes had fraudulently lured the Marcianos into the transaction. In 1990, the Nakash brothers settled for $66 million of $106 million escrowed profits and the ownership of the brand name "Gasoline" while the Marciano brothers received the brand "Diesel." In the 1990s, the Jordache brand lost some of its luster due to new competition and in 1995, they took the brand down market and started selling Jordache jeans at the discount chain Wal-Mart while higher end retailers such as Macy's dropped the brand. Their efforts were successful and in the first year with Wal-Mart, they sold $100 million in jeans which made up 30% of Jordache Enterprises total sales. They then moved into contract manufacturing - making jeans and clothing for Tommy Hilfiger, the Gap, American Eagle, and Abercrombie & Fitch.

Using profits from their apparel business, they diversified and started investing in banking and real estate primarily in New York, Miami, New Jersey and Israel. Nakash also purchased Arkia, a money-losing discount airline flying between Israel and Europe which they returned to profitability. In 2004, the brothers purchased AMPA Real Estate of Israel and expanded into the purchase of hotels and development of residential projects in Israel. They own the Park Plaza Orchid Hotel in Tel Aviv and the Kineret Orchid Vacation Resort on the Sea of Galilee.

In 2006, they invested in Israeli agriculture establishing an oil press for $2 million in partnership with Kibbutz Revivim which produces olive oil under the Halutza brand; the Nakashes have invested about $5.5 million in olive groves, olive oil production, and vineyards. In 2013, via their investment company Nakash Holdings, they purchased a $100 million office building in Washington, D.C. In 2013, they purchased (along with Eli Gindi) the Versace Mansion in Miami Beach where the Nakashes own five other hotels. In April 2013, they purchased for $105 million - via their shipping company Papo Shipping Company - the exclusive right to operate the Port of Eilat in Israel for 15 years. In April 2013, he and his brothers purchased the Isrotel Tower in Tel Aviv for $150 million.

Personal life 
Nakash practices Judaism. He is considered the patriarch of the Nakash family.

References 

American Sephardic Jews
Israeli Sephardi Jews
Sephardi Jews in Mandatory Palestine
Jewish fashion designers
American real estate businesspeople
Businesspeople from New York City
1942 births
Living people
People named in the Panama Papers
Israeli people of Iraqi-Jewish descent
Israeli people of Syrian-Jewish descent
American Mizrahi Jews
American people of Israeli descent
American fashion businesspeople